"" or "" is the national anthem of the East African Community. It is a Swahili language hymn.

Etymology
The word  in Swahili means community and its title therefore translates as "East African Community anthem".

History 
"Wimbo wa Jumuiya ya Afrika Mashariki" was composed by John Mugango in 2010

References 

African anthems
Swahili-language songs